Annerie Maria Magdalena Weber (born 2 July 1967) is a South African politician who serves as a Member of the National Assembly of South Africa. A member of the Democratic Alliance, she was elected to Parliament in May 2019. Weber served as the chairperson of the DA's caucus in the Nkangala District Municipality between 2015 and 2019.

Education
Weber obtained a BMus and a BA Honours in Psychology from the North-West University. She earned a diploma in industrial relations from the university's Vaal Triangle Campus. From the University of South Africa, she holds a higher education diploma. Weber achieved a monitoring and evaluation certificate from the National School of Governance.

Politics
Weber served as the provincial director of the Democratic Alliance in Mpumalanga from 2012 to 2014. From 2015 to 2019, she was the chairperson of the party's caucus in the Nkangala District Municipality.

In March 2018, she was elected as the provincial chairperson of the Democratic Alliance's Women Network.

Parliamentary career
After the general election that was held on 8 May 2019, Weber was selected to represent the DA in parliament. She was sworn in as a Member of the National Assembly on 22 May 2019. On 27 June 2019, she received her committee assignment.

Committee assignment
Portfolio Committee on Environment, Forestry and Fisheries (Alternate Member)

References

External links

Living people
People from Mpumalanga
Afrikaner people
Democratic Alliance (South Africa) politicians
Members of the National Assembly of South Africa
Women members of the National Assembly of South Africa
1967 births